The following is the discography of the American rock band Blue Öyster Cult.

Blue Öyster Cult has released fifteen studio albums, the most recent one being released in 2020 entitled The Symbol Remains. In 2012, the Blue Öyster Cult albums released by Columbia were re-released in a box set of sixteen CDs and one DVD. The band has sold over 24 million records worldwide, including 7 million records in the United States alone.

Albums

Studio albums

Soundtrack albums

Live albums

Compilation albums

Box sets

Singles

Other charted songs

Music videos

Notes

References

Discography
Rock music group discographies
Discographies of American artists